"Spaceman" is a song by American singer Nick Jonas. It was released as the lead single and title track of his fourth studio album on February 25, 2021. It was written by Jonas, Greg Kurstin and Maureen McDonald.

Background
Jonas first dropped hints about his upcoming album on his social media in early February 2021. The singer officially kicked off the era on February 25 by releasing the lead single "Spaceman". The lyrics were widely considered to be about the COVID-19 pandemic. When asked about the title during an interview with Zane Lowe, he explained, "The key for me was trying to find a way to give this idea a persona, give it a name. So 'Spaceman' kind of came into my mind as I was thinking, 'What's the one thing that all of us have felt during this time? Completely disconnected from the world."

Live performances
On February 20, 2021, it was announced that he would appear on Saturday Night Live on February 27 to perform his new single.
The performance included the single "Spaceman" and the second single of the album "This Is Heaven".

Music video
The music video was directed by Anthony Mandler and shows Jonas wandering a desolate planet where he lives in a futuristic mirrored abode. The foreboding cinematography by David Devlin was nominated for several awards. 

Nick Jonas unsuccessfully tries to get back home to his wife. Jonas' wife Priyanka Chopra makes appearances via a hologram and through screens he watches. The video was inspired by the COVID-19 lockdowns.

Plagiarism accusation
On March 1, 2021, French-American R&B and pop singer Lolo Zouai called out Jonas, accusing him of copying her and showing similarities between the introduction of her song "Jade" and "Spaceman". She also stated that Jonas flew her out to help her with her song and then ghosted her, also revealing that her song "High Highs to Low Lows" is partially about Jonas.

Charts

Release history

References

2021 singles
2021 songs
Music videos directed by Anthony Mandler
Nick Jonas songs
Song recordings produced by Greg Kurstin
Songs about the COVID-19 pandemic
Songs written by Greg Kurstin
Songs written by Mozella
Songs written by Nick Jonas
Songs about outer space